Gombojav Zandanshatar or Zandanshatar Gombojav (born 18 March 1970) is a prominent Mongolian politician. He is a member of the Mongolian People's Party, and has served as Party General Secretary in 2012-2013.

He has been the Chairman (Secretary) of State Great Khural, the Parliament of Mongolia, since unanimously elected on 1 February 2019. He previously served as the Chief of Cabinet Secretariat of the Government of Mongolia (2017-2019), Minister for Foreign Affairs (2009-2012) and Deputy Minister of Food and Agriculture (2003-2004).

He was first elected to State Great Khural in June 2004, thus starting his service as lawmaker. Altogether, he served three terms as a Member of Parliament in 2004-2008, 2008-2012, and 2016-2020.

Biography

Early career 
Zandanshatar’s early career started as Lecturer in the College of trade and industry (1992-1995), after which he worked at the Agricultural Bank of Mongolia, progressively on different positions as Economist, Restructuring manager, Director of Forex department, Director of Loan and Monetary Policy department (1995-1998).

Then he was appointed as the member of Receivership Team by the Central Bank of Mongolia at Agricultural Bank and later, after its restructuring, was promoted to Deputy Director of the bank (1998-2003). As a result of restructuring and reorganization the bank was recapitalized and successfully privatized in 2003.

Statesman

Deputy Minister of food and agriculture (2003-2004) 
The agricultural sector of the country was in serious crisis, especially the state of crop farming and flour production were in despair.  Zandanshatar actively worked to mobilize state support and attract foreign aid to the sector. His Ministry’s team drafted state policy on farming and agriculture which was later adopted by Parliament.  This work laid the foundation for “Atar III” campaign work that revived wheat and crop farming in Mongolia.

Minister of Foreign Affairs (2009-2012) 
During his tenure, the Ministry of Foreign Affairs has been tasked to prioritize economic relations in foreign affairs. Subsequently, the country renewed its Foreign Policy vision in 2011, for the first time after 17 years. Also, in 2011-2013 Mongolia chaired the Community of Democracies.

As Minister, his schedule comprised official visits to almost 20 countries such as U.S.A., Japan, P.R. of China, South Korea, Italy, Germany, etc.  He also started work to upgrade Mongolian-Japanese relations from Comprehensive partnership to Strategic partnership.

Zandanshatar took a series of measures to improve the ethics, discipline, and responsibility of diplomats at all levels.

Chief of the Cabinet secretariat of the Government of Mongolia (2017-2019) 
As Chief of Cabinet Secretariat, Zandanshatar worked tirelessly on government priorities, which were to establish fair, transparent, and accountable structure for public officials and to strengthen the responsibilities and regulations on all levels of government agencies. An updated Law of Public Service was adopted by the Parliament in 2018 to be adhered to starting from 2019.

He summarized all development policies and resolutions issued until that time into the “Three pillars development policy” encompassing areas of public service reform, social reform, and economic reform.

Other notable achievements during his tenure include strong anti-corruption measures taken against illegal privatization of large mining enterprises and a 50 percent improvement in air quality of Ulaanbaatar as a result of implementing smokeless fuel supply to households.

Chairman (Speaker) of State Great Khural, the Parliament of Mongolia (2019-2020) 
In 2019, his predecessor, Miyeegombyn Enkhbold, was ousted after numerous demonstrations by his political opponents, and Gombojavyn Zandanshatar was proposed and later elected unanimously by the Members of the Parliament as Chairman (Speaker).

As Chairman he brought to successful completion the historic Constitutional Amendment process.  The current Constitution of Mongolia was adopted in 1992 and since then, changes were necessitated by the socio-economic development of the country.  Amendments to the main law were discussed throughout the last three terms of Parliament and Zandanshatar was an active force in the process of studying and preparing draft amendments.  An important step in the discussion and drafting of the amendments was made in 2015 by way of introducing deliberative democracy and deliberative polling methods that Zandanshatar studied in depth while he worked as visiting scholar and fellow at Stanford University. He introduced this methodology of enabling citizens’ participation in main political changes and reaching political consensus in Mongolia.  

Based upon the opinions of the Mongolian people that have been expressed by the deliberative polling process, the Parliament of Mongolia under the chairmanship of Zandanshatar has successfully adopted the Amendments to the Constitution on the 14th of November, 2019.

Education 
Zandanshatar graduated from Baikal State University in 1992 (formerly Institute of National Economy in Soviet Union with a diploma of Specialist in Finance. He also earned a Master’s degree in Economics and Finance (1992) from Baikal State University.

He is the recipient of Honorary Professorship from his alma-mater Baikal State University (2011), Mongolian University of Science and Technology (2019), and Ikh Zasag University (2019).

In 2014–2015 and 2016, Zandanshatar was a visiting scholar at the Center on Democracy, Development, and the Rule of Law at Stanford University in California. He was impressed by the concept of deliberative polling developed by the center's director, James Fishkin, and translated his book on it, When the People Speak, into Mongolian.  In 2017 the country officially adopted deliberative polling as a condition for constitutional changes.

Personal life / Family 
Zandanshatar married his wife Ganbayaryn Otgongerel in 1992, and together they have four children.

Significance of Constitutional Amendments of 2019

Further development of parliamentary democracy and the guarantee of peoples’ power to govern 
 Improvements to constitutional regulations on parliamentary activities, ensuring the rise of people’s trust in the government
 Clarifying the powers of State Great Khural with regard to economic and social development policy, budgeting, and finances, the checks and balances between legislative and executive authorities will be improved
 The principles of natural resources being under the people’s control and state protection, ensuring the rights of generations to live in a safe and clean environment;  securing the principle of equal and fair distribution of profits from mineral resources to every citizen;  the people’s right to the majority of benefits from strategic deposits will be assured by relevant law
 Establishing the principles of political party activities and prerequisites within the constitutional framework, to positively affect the development of political parties

Amendments regarding Executive power 
 Improved regulations of Prime Minister nomination, forming the government, Prime Minister’s act of nominating or dismissing his cabinet ministers, as well as dismissal of Prime Minister, casting a vote of confidence and procedures of the concurrent service in both parliament and cabinet; clear boundaries between legislative and executive branches with strengthened mutual checks and balances and a foundation for government stability
 Allowed Prime Minister to form his own cabinet, better adherence to cabinet principles, while maintaining sustainable policy and agenda
 Prime Minister directly accountable to State Great Hural, striving to appoint professional and competent individuals as cabinet members, who are in turn accountable to the Prime Minister directly
 Updated requirements for Presidential candidate, term and process of vesting certain powers, the presidential interaction with legislative, executive, and judicial powers will be brought into conformity with fundamental principles of the Constitution and the essence of the parliamentary governance

Amendments ensuring judicial independence, increase accountability of judges/arbiters 
 Improved judicial structures and making court services better accessible and relevant to the citizens
 Guaranteed arbiters’ impartiality and courts’ independence
 Independent establishment of institutions that select and reprimand judges; enhance judiciary capacity while guaranteeing human rights and freedom; strengthened public confidence in judicial system

Amendments on local administration 
 Will enhance structures for the administrative and territorial units of Mongolia and provide the opportunity to implement administrative reform
 By clarifying management roles and responsibilities of local self-governance and expanding its powers in budgeting, taxes, property and financial rights, the opportunities for independent development and decentralization will be provided
 By transferring some powers to administrative and territorial units based on legislative grounds for city and village self-governance, eliminating administrative duplication; better conditions for city and village development

References

1970 births
Living people
Members of the State Great Khural
Speakers of the State Great Khural
Mongolian People's Party politicians
Foreign ministers of Mongolia
Recipients of the Order of Prince Yaroslav the Wise, 3rd class
People from Bayankhongor Province
21st-century Mongolian politicians